{| align="right" width="275px" class="toccolours" border="0" cellpadding="1" cellspacing="0" style="margin:0 0 1em 1em; border:1px solid #gray; font-size:11px"
| align="center" colspan="2" |Part of a series about  Communities in Nova Scotia
|-
| align="right" width="300px"  colspan="2" |  
|-
|align="center" colspan="2" | Communities in Halifax Regional Municipality
|-
| align="center" colspan="2" style="color:white; background-color:#ccccff;"||-
| align="center" colspan="2" | 
|-
| style="background:white; border-top:0px solid gray;" align="left" colspan="2" | 
|-
| align="center" colspan="2" style="color:white; background-color:#ccccff;"|Community Statistics|-
| align="left" |Area 
| align="right" | 6.69 km2
|-
| align="left" |Population 
| align="right" |360*
|-
| align="center" colspan="2" style="color:white; background-color:#ccccff;"|Neighbourhoods in Community|-
|  align="center" colspan="2" | Mineville
|-
| align="center" colspan="2" style="color:white; background-color:#ccccff;"|Incorporated Towns & Municipalities|-
| align="center" colspan="2" | Halifax Regional Municipality
|-
| align="center" colspan="2" style="color:white; background-color:#ccccff;"|Other Information|-
| align="left" |Website 
| align="right"|http://www.mineville.ca/
|-
| align="center" colspan="2" style="color:white; background-color:#ccccff;"|Adjacent Communities|-
|  align="center" colspan="2"  |NORTH|-
| style="background:white; border-bottom:1px solid gray;" align="center" colspan="2"  |East Preston, Lake Echo
|-
| align="center" width="137px"  |WEST| style="border-left:1px solid gray;" align="center" width="137px"|EAST|-
| align="center" width="137px"|Lawrencetown, 
| style="border-left:1px solid gray;" align="center" width="137px"|  West Porters Lake, Porters Lake 
|-
| style="border-top:1px solid gray;" align="center" colspan="2"  |SOUTH|-
| align="center" colspan="2"  | East Lawrencetown  
|-
| align="center" colspan="2" style="color:white; background-color:#ccccff;"|Footnotes|-
| align="center" colspan="2"  |* According to StatCan Census Year 2001
|-
|}Mineville, Nova Scotia'''  is a suburban community in the east of Halifax Regional Municipality, Nova Scotia, Canada, between Lake Echo on Trunk 7, Highway 107  and Upper Lawrencetown on Route 207. The main road is Mineville Road. The other road is Candy Mountain Road. The community has two lakes: Lawrencetown Lake and Lake Echo.

External links
Mineville Community Association
Mineville from space
2008 Fire
Nova Scotia Government News release

Communities in Halifax, Nova Scotia
General Service Areas in Nova Scotia